(Adèle) Henriette Negrin, (or Nigrin), born on October 4, 1877, in Fontainebleau, died in 1965 in Venice, was a French clothes-designer and textile artist. She created fabrics and clothes, working alongside her husband Mariano Fortuny.

Biography
Henriette Negrin met Mariano Fortuny in Paris at the beginning of the 20th century and, in 1902, went to live with him in Venice at the Palazzo Pesaro degli Orfei, now Palazzo Fortuny, one of the museums of the city.

Henriette Negrin and her husband shared an interest for textile creations. In particular, she researched pigments for the dying of fabrics, applying the dyes herself to the wood stencils for printing the textiles. Together, they developed a pleating machine the patent for which was filed by the National Institute of Industrial Property (France) of Paris on June 10, 1909. In a signed hand-written note on a copy of the patent (copy kept at the Marciana Library), Mariano Fortuny acknowledged his future wife as the inventor of the machine: " Ce brevet est de la propriété de Madame Henriette Brassart qui est l’inventeur. J’ai pris ce brevet en mon nom pour l’urgence du dépôt." ("This patent is the property of Madame Henriette Brassart who is the inventor. I submitted this patent in my name given the urgency of filing").

This pleating technique plays a central role in the design of the Delphos gown, whose creation Henriette Negrin confirmed as her own in a letter to Elsie McNeill Lee, at the time the exclusive distributor of the Fortuny fabrics and dresses in the United States.
In the letter, Henriette Negrin indicated her decision to terminate all production of the dress that she had designed.

During the 47 years of her life with Mariano Fortuny, Henriette Negrin was fully involved in all aspects of their creative life. After his death, she curated her husband's art collection, donating works to several museums and compiling the inventory of the contents of their residence. She donated the building to the city of Venice, which came into its full possession after her death in 1965.

References

1877 births
1965 deaths
People from Fontainebleau
French artists
20th-century fashion
French fashion designers
French women fashion designers
French expatriates in Italy